Aleksandar Yakimov (born 27 April 1989) is a Bulgarian footballer who plays as a midfielder for Vihren Sandanski.

Career
Yakimov started to play football in local club Pirin. During 2007/2008 season he played with Pirin in the Bulgarian amateur division. Pirin took first place and won promotion to the "B" professional football group. On 9 August 2008 Yakimov made his debut in professional football in a match against Botev Krivodol.

On 4 July 2017, Yakimov joined Belasitsa Petrich but was with the team only for pre-season training.  On 1 August 2017, he signed with Vihren Sandanski.

In October 2008 the Bulgarian national under-21 coach Ivan Kolev called Yakimov up to the Bulgaria national under-21 football team for friendly matches with Greece U21 and Macedonia U21.

References

External links
 Footmercato profile

1989 births
Living people
Bulgarian footballers
Bulgaria under-21 international footballers
OFC Pirin Blagoevgrad players
PFC Pirin Blagoevgrad players
FC Bansko players
PFC CSKA Sofia players
FC Botev Vratsa players
PFC Lokomotiv Plovdiv players
PFC Belasitsa Petrich players
FC Vereya players
FC Tsarsko Selo Sofia players
OFC Vihren Sandanski players
First Professional Football League (Bulgaria) players
Second Professional Football League (Bulgaria) players

Association football midfielders